Charles Napier may refer to:
Sir Charles James Napier (1782–1853), British general
Sir Charles Napier (Royal Navy officer) (1786–1860), Royal Navy admiral
Charles Elers Napier (1812–1847), Royal Navy officer, stepson of the above
Charles Ottley Groom Napier (1839–1894), British writer
Charles Napier (RAF officer) (1892–1918), British World War I flying ace
Charles Scott Napier (1899–1946), British general
Charlie Napier (1910–1973), Scottish footballer
Charles Napier (actor) (1936–2011), American actor
Charles Napier, former treasurer of the Paedophile Information Exchange
Sir Charles Napier Inn, an early 19th-century pub in Chinnor, Oxfordshire, England, named after the 19th-century general